Bullseye Glass is a glass manufacturer in Brooklyn, Portland, Oregon, in the United States. The company is a significant supplier of raw art glass for fused glass makers.

According to Art Glass Magazine, production controls at Bullseye's U.S. plant is more consistent than imported products, allowing it to fuse reliably.

History

Bullseye Glass Company was founded in 1974 by Dan Schwoerer, Boyce Lundstrom, and Ray Ahlgren.

In early 2016, high levels of the toxic heavy metals cadmium, arsenic and chromium were discovered in the vicinity of the company's plant in East Portland. After production with some of the heavy metals was voluntarily halted by Bullseye and others, their production of several colors of art glass was restricted.

In fall of 2016, Bullseye completed installation of a baghouse emission control system that successfully reduced all emissions to levels required by state and federal regulations.

See also

 List of companies based in Oregon

References

External links

 

1974 establishments in Oregon
American companies established in 1974
Brooklyn, Portland, Oregon
Glassmaking companies of the United States
Manufacturing companies based in Portland, Oregon